Stephan Zaayman (born 18 June 1993) is a South African rugby union player, currently playing with Czech Extraliga team RC Slavia Prague. His regular position is flanker or number 8.

Career

Youth

In 2012, he made five starts in the 2012 Under-19 Provincial Championship Division B competition, scoring one try.

Senior career

In 2016, Zaayman moved to Italy to join National Championship of Excellence team Rugby Reggio.

References

1993 births
Living people
Eastern Province Elephants players
Rugby union players from Middelburg, Mpumalanga
South African rugby union players
Rugby union flankers